The 1940 United States Senate election in Ohio took place on November 5, 1940. Incumbent Democratic Senator Vic Donahey did not run for re-election to a second term. In the open race to succeed him, Republican Mayor of Cleveland Harold Hitz Burton defeated Democratic U.S. Representative John McSweeney.

Democratic primary

Candidates
Herbert S. Bigelow, former U.S. Representative from Cincinnati (1937–39)
John McSweeney, former U.S. Representative from Wooster (1923–29, 1937–39)

Results

Republican primary

Candidates
Harold Hitz Burton, Mayor of Cleveland
Charles E. Wharton
Dudley A. White, U.S. Representative from New London

Results

General election

Results

See also 
 1940 United States Senate elections

References

Ohio
1940
1940 Ohio elections